Helsinki City Library (until 1910 Helsinki People's Library) is the largest public library in Finland. Owned by the City of Helsinki, the library has 37 branches and a collection of about 1.56 million books. The City Library is part of the Helsinki Metropolitan Area Libraries network.

History

Helsinki People's Library (1860–1876) 
On 7 October 1860, the Helsinki People's Library opened at Hallituskatu 11, the current location of the University of Helsinki's Porthania building. Funding for the library was raised by the Helsinki Women's Association with the goal of educating Helsinki's residents and provide them with constructive leisure activities. The effort was led by teacher Helene Simelius, author Zacharias Topelius, and Bishop .

In its first year of operation, the library held about 400 to 500 books (primarily in Swedish) and circulated about 1,700 loans. Borrowing books was free, which allowed the library to enjoy many patrons, but at the same time it caused financial problems. The library had to move from one rented location to another every couple of years, and the volunteer librarians also changed frequently. Due to its lack of funding, the library began charging patrons in 1867, and in 1871 it began to receive an annual subsidy from the City of Helsinki. Thanks to the city's support, the library's finances stabilized, and it could hire a professional staff.

Five years later, the library's board offered to transfer the library to the city. On 28 March 1876, the City Council of Helsinki formally agreed to take over operation of the library. As the library already operated with city funding, there were no major changes in operations. At the time of the transfer to the city, the People's Library's annual circulation was about 15,000 loans and its collections included more than 2,000 books.

From People's Library to City Library (1876–1945) 

With the city now in control of the library, it began planning for a dedicated building. In 1877, Helsingin Anniskeluyhtiö (Helsinki Liquor Co.), which held a monopoly on alcohol sales in the city on the condition it devoted its profits to benefiting city workers, donated 61,405.29 Finnish markka ( in 2020) for the library to secure its own building. A plot of land was acquired on the corner of Rikhardinkatu and Korkeavuorenkatu in the Kaartinkaupunki district, and architect Theodor Höijer was contracted to design the building. The library moved to its new home in autumn 1882.

With the Rikhardinkatu Library complete, the city began developing branch libraries. In 1898–1899, branch libraries were established in Töölö and Punavuori, and the private Sörnäinen People's Library was taken over by the city. Additional branches opened in Vallila in 1908 and Käpylä in 1926. Most of these branches operated from rented locations, except for the Kallio Library, which received a Karl Hård af Segerstad-building in 1912.

In 1910, the library adopted a new charter as the "Helsinki City Library." As the People's Library, the focus was on the needs of working populace, but the City Library was required to serve all residents regardless of social class.

At the turn of the 19th and 20th centuries, the library's annual circulation volume exceeded 200,000 loans. In 1912, there was a shift to free borrowing and the circulation rate quickly rose to 500,000. In 1930, the library achieved 1 million loans for the first time. To handle the library's growing collection and activity, the Rikhardinkatu Library was expanded in 1922, and through the 1930s the city sought to build a new main library; however, the outbreak of World War II in 1939 mooted those efforts.

Growing with Helsinki (1945–) 
After World War II, the establishment of the  brought a great expansion to the City Library. It absorbed the libraries of the former municipalities of Haaga, Huopalahti, Oulunkylä, and Kulosaari, along with libraries in the Helsinki Rural District. In total a dozen additional libraries were added to City Library's five branches and one main location. In 1953, it opened a music library and in 1966 it began operating a bookmobile. In 1986, the library finally completed construction of a new main library in Eastern Pasila. In 2019, the Helsinki City Library registered more than 9 million visitors to its branches.

In 1981, the Helsinki City Library began serving as the national central library for Finnish public libraries, and in 2018 it gained responsibility for overseeing development of libraries nationwide under the 2016 Public Libraries Act.

About the City Library 
 the Helsinki Library has 36 branches and one main location. It also operates two bookmobiles and four "patient libraries" in medical facilities.

Special collections 
The most significant collection in the Helsinki City Library is the Helsinki Collection of material related to the growth of the city. The Rikhardinkatu Library has a British Collection of English-language literature and an artist's book collection. Branch libraries also contain material about their local area.

Locations

Closed branches

References

Further reading 
 
 
 
 
 

Libraries in Finland
Helsinki
1860 establishments in Finland
Libraries established in 1860